Actinochaetopteryx nudibasis is a species of parasitic fly in the family Tachinidae.

Distribution
Malaysia.

References

Diptera of Asia
Dexiinae
Insects described in 1935
Taxa named by John Russell Malloch
Insects of Malaysia